is a former Japanese former footballer.

Career
Arai retired in December 2019, citing issues with a recurring knee injury.

Club statistics
Updated to 23 February 2020.

References

External links
Profile at Nagano Parceiro
Profile at Giravanz Kitakyushu

1989 births
Living people
Nippon Sport Science University alumni
Association football people from Ibaraki Prefecture
Japanese footballers
J2 League players
J3 League players
Giravanz Kitakyushu players
AC Nagano Parceiro players
Association football midfielders